Lieutenant General Bengt Anders Lehander (25 June 1925 – 9 May 1994) was a Swedish Air Force officer. His senior commands include wing commander of the Skaraborg Wing, Vice Chief of the Defence Staff, military commander of the Eastern Military District and Commandant General in Stockholm.

Early life
Lehander was born on 25 June 1925 in Skagersvik, Sweden, the son of Anders Lehander and his wife Gerda (née Gustafsson). He passed studentexamen in Linköping in 1944.

Career
Lehander was commissioned as an officer in 1947 and was assigned as a second lieutenant to the Swedish Air Force. Lehander served as a flight instructor at the Swedish Air Force Flying School from 1948 to 1955 and completed the technical course at the Royal Swedish Air Force Staff College from 1956 to 1957. He then served as a staff officer in the Air Staff's Operation Department from 1957 to 1960 before serving as Director of Flight Operations at the Södermanland Wing (F 11) from 1960 to 1962.

Lehander served as deputy head and head of the Air Staff's Organization Department from 1962 to 1965, and as staff officer at the Ministry of Defence from 1965 to 1968. He was promoted to colonel and appointed wing commander of the Skaraborg Wing (F 7) in 1968, and then served as head of division at the Defence Materiel Administration from 1972 to 1974. Lehander was promoted to major general in the Swedish Air Force 1974 and served as head of the Central Planning at the Defence Materiel Administration from 1974 to 1978. He was appointed Vice Chief of the Defence Staff in 1978 and head of the Planning Command (Planeringsledningen) in the Defence Staff. On 1 October 1982 he was promoted to lieutenant general and appointed military commander of the Eastern Military District, serving until 1988. Lehander also served as Commandant General in Stockholm from 1982 to 1988 when he retired.

Personal life
In 1955, he married Isabella Laurell (born 1931), the daughter of Alvar Laurell and Flory (née Månsson).

Death
Lehander died on 9 May 1994 and was buried at Danderyd Cemetery on 7 June 1994.

Dates of rank
1947 – Second lieutenant
1949 – Lieutenant
1956 – Captain
1960 – Major
1963 – Lieutenant colonel
1968 – Colonel
1972 – Senior colonel
1974  – Major general
1982 – Lieutenant general

Awards and decorations
   Commander 1st Class of the Order of the Sword (6 June 1974)
  Knight of the Order of the Sword (1964)

Bibliography

References

1925 births
1994 deaths
Swedish Air Force lieutenant generals
People from Gullspång Municipality
Commanders First Class of the Order of the Sword